Robert Thomas Wagner Jr. served as Delaware's state auditor from 1989 to 2019. A Republican, he lost to incumbent Democratic Auditor Dennis E. Greenhouse in 1986, but was appointed to the position in 1989 after Greenhouse resigned after being elected New Castle County County Executive. He was elected to full terms in 1990, 1994, 1998, 2002, 2006, 2010 and 2014. Prior to becoming auditor, Wagner was mayor of Camden, Delaware.

On February 17, 2018, Wagner announced that he would not seek reelection in the November general election, citing health concerns in his need for a kidney transplant taking attention away from his job.

Electoral history

References

20th-century American politicians
21st-century American politicians
Delaware Republicans
Delaware State Auditors
Living people
Mayors of places in Delaware
People from Camden, Delaware
Year of birth missing (living people)